This is a list of rivers that drain into the Baltic Sea (clockwise from Öresund):

Sweden

Svartån (at Svarte near Ystad)
Tommarpaån (at Simrishamn)
Helgeå (at Nyehusen near Kristianstad)
Hemån (at Karlskrona)
Ljungbyån (at Ljungby near Kalmar)
Emån (at  near Kalmar)
Göta Canal (at Mem near Söderköping)
Motala ström (at Norrköping)
Nyköpingsån (at Nyköping)
Dalälven (at Gävle)
Ljusnan (at Söderhamn)
Indalsälven (at Sundsvall)
Ångermanälven (at Härnösand)
Ume älv (at Umeå)
Skellefte älv (at Skellefteå)
Pite älv (at Piteå)
Lule älv (at Luleå)
Kalix älv (at Kalix)
Torne älv (at Haparanda/Torneå)

Finland

Tornionjoki (at Haparanda/Tornio)
Kemijoki (at Kemi)
Simojoki (at Simo)
Iijoki (at Ii)
Kiiminkijoki (at Haukipudas)
Oulujoki (at Oulu)
Siikajoki (at Siikajoki)
Pyhäjoki (at Pyhäjoki)
Kalajoki (at Kalajoki)
Kyrönjoki (near Vaasa)
Kokemäenjoki (at Pori)
Aurajoki (at Turku)
Vantaanjoki (at Helsinki)
Porvoonjoki (at Porvoo)
Kymijoki (at Kotka and near Ruotsinpyhtää)

Russia

Neva (at St Petersburg)
Pregolya (Pregel) at Kaliningrad (Königsberg)
Neman at Neman (Kaliningrad Oblast)

Estonia

Narva (at Narva-Jõesuu)
Jägala (at Jõesuu)
Pirita (at Tallinn)
Keila (at Keila-Joa)
Kasari (at Matsalu)
Pärnu (at Pärnu)

Latvia

Gauja, (between Carnikava and Gauja)
Daugava (at Riga)
Lielupe (at Jūrmala)
Venta River (at Ventspils)

Lithuania

Nemunas at Šilutė

Poland

Pasłęka at Braniewo
Nogat between Gdańsk and Elbląg
Vistula at Gdańsk
Radunia at Gdańsk
Reda  near Wejherowo
Łeba at Łebsko Lake
Słupia at Ustka
Wieprza at Darłowo
Parsęta at Kołobrzeg
Rega near Trzebiatów
Oder (Polish Odra) at Szczecin
Swelinia near Sopot

Germany

Uecker at Ueckermünde
Peene at Anklam
Recknitz at Ribnitz-Damgarten
Warnow at Warnemünde near Rostock
Trave at Travemünde near Lübeck
Schwentine at Kiel

See also
 
 Lists of rivers
 

 
Baltic Sea
Baltic Sea
Geography of Northern Europe